Dichlorooctylisothiazolinone, DCOIT or  DCOI, is the organic compound with the formula SC(Cl)=C(Cl)C(O)NC7H15.  It is a white solid that melts near room temperature. It is an isothiazolinone, a class of heterocyclic compounds used as biocides. DCOIT has attracted attention as an antifouling compound.  It is a replacement for organotin compounds that have been largely banned for causing environmental damage. DCOIT however is itself controversial.

Safety

Isothiazolinones are highly bioactive and have attracted scrutiny for causing contact dermatitis.

References

Preservatives
Isothiazolidinones
Chloroarenes